Leonseius is a genus of mites in the Phytoseiidae family.

Species
 Leonseius regularis (De Leon, 1965)

References

Phytoseiidae